Todor Todorov (born 11 November 1961) is a Bulgarian bobsledder. He competed in the two man event at the 1988 Winter Olympics.

References

1961 births
Living people
Bulgarian male bobsledders
Olympic bobsledders of Bulgaria
Bobsledders at the 1988 Winter Olympics
Place of birth missing (living people)